Juan Manuel Fangio was an Argentinian racing driver who won five Formula One world championships. He won 24 out of 52 races in his career and formerly held the record for the most Grand Prix victories for eleven years. He entered Formula One with Alfa Romeo at the inaugural Formula One season to become a pioneer of the sport alongside fellow World Champions Giuseppe Farina and Alberto Ascari, finishing runner-up behind Farina before clinching his maiden drivers' title the following year. Fangio became one of the leading drivers in the early days of Formula One as he dominated the mid-1950s by winning four consecutive world championships with Maserati, Mercedes and Ferrari to become the only driver to win world championships with four different teams and, most importantly, the record world champion at the time with five drivers' titles. Fangio is also the oldest driver to win a Formula One World Championship to date, aged 46 years and 41 days.

Fangio achieved his first victory at the 1950 Monaco Grand Prix on 21 May, followed by two further victories at the same year in Belgium and France. He remained with Alfa Romeo for another season and won his maiden driver's title by achieving three victories. He was driving instead for BRM in non-championship Formula One races, but was later ruled out from the remainder of the season following a serious crash in Monza. In , he took two wins at the start of the season before joining Mercedes midway through the season, securing a further four wins en route to winning his second world championship overall.

The majority of his race victories came with Mercedes as he scored eight wins with the German manufacturer; he also took seven victories with Maserati, six with Alfa Romeo and the remaining three victories with Ferrari. He was most successful at the Autódromo Oscar y Juan Gálvez on home soil in Argentina with four victories, more than any other driver. His largest winning margin happened on three occasions (Monaco, Italy and Great Britain) by respectively lapping the entire field. His narrowest winning margin was at the 1954 French Grand Prix by finishing just 0.100 seconds ahead of Karl Kling, which is considered as one of the closest finishes in Formula One history.

Wins 

Key:
 No. – Victory number; for example, "1" signifies Fangio's first race win.
 Race – Race number in Fangio's Formula One career; for example "20" signifies Fangio's 20th Formula One race.
 Grid – The position on the grid from which Fangio started the race.
 Margin – Margin of victory, given in the format of minutes:seconds.milliseconds
  – Driver's Championship winning season.

Number of wins at different Grands Prix 

Fangio has won at 11 out of 12 different Grands Prix he has partaken in. The Pescara Grand Prix is the sole event he has entered and not won.

Number of wins at different circuits 

Fangio has won at 12 out of 14 different circuits he has competed on. The Aintree Motor Racing Circuit and the Circuito di Pescara are the circuits he has driven on and not won.

See also
 List of Formula One Grand Prix winners

Notes

References

External links 
 Drivers: Hall of Fame: Juan Manuel Fangio
 Juan Manuel Fangio: Involvement from Stats F1

Fangio, Juan Manuel
1950s in motorsport
1950s-related lists
Juan Manuel Fangio